Acanthophila beljaevi is a moth in the family Gelechiidae. It is found in Japan and Russia, where it is known only from the southern part of Primorsky Krai.

The wingspan is 12–13 mm. The pattern of the forewings is similar to Acanthophila kuznetzovi. The hindwings are grey.

Etymology
The species is named for Dr. E.A. Beljaev of the Institute of Biology and Pedology in Vladivostok, who collected the type series.

References

beljaevi
Moths described in 1998
Moths of Japan
Moths of Asia